Hemicaranx bicolor is a species of Jack Fishes in the family Carangidae. It is found in the eastern Atlantic Ocean around Africa.

Distribution and habitat 
This species of jack is found in the eastern Atlantic Ocean around western Africa. It is known to occur in rivers and estuaries.

Description 

References 

bicolor
Fish described in 1860
Taxa named by Albert Günther